Johnny Greaves (born 4 March 1979) is an English former light welterweight professional boxer. A prolific journeyman, he fought in 100 matches during his professional career, winning four in total - including his final fight.

Career
Greaves turned professional in 2007, after a brief spell as an amateur while fighting on the unlicensed circuit. He marked his debut with a points loss against Rob Hunt (4-0-0). With his first ten fights ending in defeat, Greaves managed to win his eleventh with a first round technical knockout against Sergejs Rozakmens (2-21-1). Match ups stopped coming for a while after his first win, with promoters wary about the risk of exposing one of their fighters against a boxer who could potentially ruin unbeaten records. But like most journeymen, Greaves settled for a life fighting up and coming prospects.

His next two wins came against Ali Wyatt (4-11-2) and Floyd Moore (in his professional debut), winning both on point verdicts. The latter, Moore eventually beat Greaves in a rematch a few years later. Greaves ended his career in 2013 at York Hall with a win against Dan Carr (2-42-2).

The documentary film Cornered, shown on BT Sport, follows the life of Greaves during the latter stages of his boxing career.

References

Further reading

1979 births
English male boxers
Light-welterweight boxers
Living people
People from Forest Gate
Boxers from Greater London